The empty tomb is the Christian tradition that the tomb of Jesus was found empty after his crucifixion. The canonical gospels are consistent on the incident, with variations, of the visit of women to Jesus' tomb. Although Jesus' body had been laid out in the tomb after crucifixion and death, the tomb is found to be empty, the body gone, and the women are told by angels (or a "young man [...] dressed in a white robe") that he has risen. The gospel accounts are based on earlier oral traditions.

Gospel accounts

Overview
Although the four canonical gospels detail the narrative, oral traditions existed well before the composition of the gospels on the matter. The four gospels were almost certainly not by eyewitnesses, at least in their final forms, but were instead the end-products of long oral and written transmission. Three of the four (Mark, Luke, and Matthew) are called the synoptics (meaning "seeing together"), because they present very similar stories, and it is generally agreed that this is because two of them, Matthew and Luke, have used Mark as their source. The earliest of them, Mark, dates probably from around AD 65–70, some forty years after the death of Jesus, while Matthew and Luke date from around AD 85–90. John, the last gospel to be completed, began circulating between 90 and 110, and its narrative of the empty tomb is not merely a different form of the story told in the synoptics, but after  differs to such an extent that according to Edward Adams and Mary Evans, it cannot be harmonised with the earlier three.

All four gospels relay the story, but relay distinct details about the empty tomb. In the original ending of the Gospel of Mark, the oldest, three women visit the tomb to anoint the body of Jesus, but find instead a "young man [...] dressed in a white robe" who tells them that Jesus will meet the disciples in Galilee. The women then flee, telling no one. Matthew introduces guards and a curious doublet where the women are told twice, by angels and then by Jesus, that he will meet the disciples in Galilee. Luke changes Mark's one "young man [...] dressed in a white robe" to two, adds Peter's inspection of the tomb, and deletes the promise that Jesus would meet his disciples in Galilee.

The synoptics
 probably represents a complete unit of oral tradition taken over by the author. It concludes with the women fleeing from the empty tomb and telling no one what they have seen, and the general scholarly view is that this was the original ending of this gospel, with the remaining verses, being added later. The imagery of a young man in a white robe, and the reaction of the women, indicates that this is an encounter with an angel. The empty tomb fills the women with fear and alarm, not with faith in the risen Lord, although the mention of a meeting in Galilee is evidence of some sort of previous, pre-Markan, tradition linking Galilee and the resurrection.

Matthew revises Mark's account to make it more convincing and coherent. The description of the angel is taken from Daniel's angel with a face "like the appearance of lightning" and his God with "raiment white as snow", and Daniel also provides the reaction of the guards. The introduction of the guard is apparently aimed at countering stories that Jesus' body had been stolen by his disciples, thus eliminating any explanation of the empty tomb other than that offered by the angel, that he has been raised. Matthew introduces a curious doublet whereby the women are told twice, by the angels and then by Jesus, that he will meet the disciples in Galilee—the reasons for this are unknown.

Luke changes Mark's one "young man [...] dressed in a white robe" to two, makes reference to earlier passion predictions, and adds Peter's inspection of the tomb. He also deletes the promise that Jesus would meet his disciples in Galilee. In Mark and Matthew, Jesus tells the disciples to meet him there, but in Luke the post-resurrection appearances are only in Jerusalem. Mark and Luke tell the reader that the women visited the tomb in order to finish anointing the body of Jesus, but this explanation seems artificial given that it could have been done on the evening of the crucifixion rather than 36 hours later; in Matthew the women came simply to see the tomb, and in John no reason is given. The story ends with Peter visiting the tomb and seeing the burial cloths, but instead of believing in the resurrection he remains perplexed.

The following table, with translations from the New International Version, allows the three versions to be compared. (in which Peter goes to the tomb, may be an addition to the original gospel taken from John's version of the narrative).

John
John's chapter 20 can be divided into three scenes: (1) the discovery of the empty tomb, verses 1–10; (2) appearance of Jesus to Mary Magdalene, 11–18; and (3) appearances to the disciples, especially Thomas, verses 19–29; the last is not part of the "empty tomb" episode and is not included in the following table. He introduces the "beloved disciple", who visits the tomb with Peter and understands its significance before Peter. The author seems to have combined three traditions, one involving a visit to the tomb by several women early in the morning (of which the "we" in "we do not know where they have taken him" is a fragmentary remnant), a second involving a visit to the empty tomb by Peter and perhaps by other male disciples, and a third involving an appearance of Jesus to Mary Magdalene. John has reduced this to the solitary Mary Magdalene in order to introduce the conversation between her and Jesus, but the presence of "we" when she informs the disciples may be a remnant of the original group of women, since mourning and the preparation of bodies by anointing were social rather than solitary activities.

Origins

Cultural and religious context

Although Jews, Greeks, and Romans all believed in the reality of resurrection, they differed in their respective conceptions and interpretations of it. Christians certainly knew of numerous resurrection-events allegedly experienced by persons other than Jesus: the early 3rd-century Christian theologian Origen, for example, did not deny the resurrection of the 7th-century BCE semi-legendary Greek poet Aristeas or the immortality of the 2nd-century CE Greek youth Antinous, the beloved of the Roman Emperor Hadrian, but said the first had been the work of demons, not God, while the second, unlike Jesus, was unworthy of worship. Christians drew specifically from Jewish resurrection belief, rather than the myths of Greeks and Romans to form their understanding of Jesus' resurrection.

Mark Goodacre writes that using "empty tomb" to refer to the disappearance of Jesus' body may be a misnomer since first-century tombs in Judea were built to house multiple bodies. As such, Mark narrates that the women had seen the spot where Jesus was laid while the later gospels state that the tomb was "new" and unused.

"Assumption" or "translation" stories
The composition and classification of the empty tomb story have been the subject of considerable debate. Several scholars have argued that the empty tomb story in Mark is similar to "assumption" or "translation" stories, and not a resurrection story, in which certain special individuals are described as being transported into the divine realm (heaven) before or after their death. Adela Yarbro Collins, for example, explains the Markan narrative as a Markan deduction from an early Christian belief in the resurrection. She classifies it as a translation story, meaning a story of the removal of a newly-immortal hero to a non-Earthly realm. According to Daniel Smith, a missing body was far more likely to be interpreted as an instance of removal by a divine agent than as an instance of resurrection or resuscitation. However, Smith also notes that certain elements within Mark's empty tomb story are inconsistent with an assumption narrative, most importantly the response to the women from the young man at the tomb: ("He is risen" Mark 16:6). Pointing to the existence in earlier Jewish texts both of the idea of resurrection from the grave and of that of a heavenly assumption of the resurrected, Dale Allison argues that resurrection and assumption are not mutually contradicting ideas, and that the empty tomb story probably involved both from the beginning.

Scepticism about the empty tomb narrative

Early on, the stories about the empty tomb were met with scepticism. The Gospel of Matthew already mentions stories that the body was stolen from the grave. Other suggestions, not supported in mainstream scholarship, are that Jesus had not really died on the cross, or was lost due to natural causes.

The absence of any reference to the story of Jesus' empty tomb in the Pauline epistles and the Easter kerygma (preaching or proclamation) of the earliest church, originating perhaps in the Christian community of Antioch in the 30s and preserved in 1 Corinthians, has led some scholars to suggest that Mark invented it. Allison, however, finds this argument from silence unconvincing. 

Most scholars believe that John wrote independently of Mark and that the Gospel of Mark and the Gospel of John contain two independent attestations of an empty tomb, which in turn suggests that both used already-existing sources and appealed to a commonly held tradition, though Mark may have added to and adapted that tradition to fit his narrative. How and why Mark adapts his material is unclear. Smith believes that Mark has adapted two separate traditions of resurrection and disappearance into one Easter narrative.

Empty tomb and resurrection appearances
According to Rudolf Bultmann, "Easter stories [...] fall into two groups – stories of the empty tomb and stories of the appearance of the risen Lord, though there are stories that combine them both (Mt 28:1–8, 9f; Jn 20:1, 11–18)." N. T. Wright emphatically and extensively argues for the reality of the empty tomb and the subsequent appearances of Jesus, reasoning that as a matter of "inference" both a bodily resurrection and later bodily appearances of Jesus are far better explanations for the empty tomb and the 'meetings' and the rise of Christianity than are any other theories, including those of Ehrman. Dale Allison has argued for an empty tomb, that was later followed by visions of Jesus by the Apostles and Mary Magdalene. According to Géza Vermes, the empty tomb developed independently from the post-resurrection appearances, as they are never directly coordinated to form a combined argument. While the coherence of the empty tomb narrative is questionable, it is "clearly an early tradition". Vermes rejects the literal interpretation of the story, and also notes that the story of the empty tomb conflicts with notions of a spiritual resurrection. According to Vermes, "[t]he strictly Jewish bond of spirit and body is better served by the idea of the empty tomb and is no doubt responsible for the introduction of the notions of palpability (Thomas in John) and eating (Luke and John)." New Testament historian Bart D. Ehrman rejects the story of the empty tomb, and argues that "an empty tomb had nothing to do with [believe in the resurrection] [...] an empty tomb would not produce faith". Ehrman argues that the empty tomb was needed to underscore the physical resurrection of Jesus.

See also

References

Sources

Further reading
 
 
 
 
 

 
Alleged tombs of Jesus
Angelic apparitions in the Bible
Christian terminology
Resurrection of Jesus in the New Testament
Historicity and origin of the Resurrection of Jesus